Paul's Ottobine Mill is a historic former mill building at 8061 Judge Paul Road in rural Rockingham County, Virginia, west of Dayton.  It is a two-story gambrel-roofed frame building, constructed in 1937-38 on the foundation of an older mill.  The site has an industrial history dating to 1799, and portions of the older water control channels are still evident.  The building, now converted to residential use, retains a suite of historic mill equipment in its interior.

The mill was listed on the National Register of Historic Places in 2017.

See also
National Register of Historic Places listings in Rockingham County, Virginia

References

Grinding mills on the National Register of Historic Places in Virginia
Industrial buildings completed in 1938
Buildings and structures in Rockingham County, Virginia
National Register of Historic Places in Rockingham County, Virginia
Grinding mills in Virginia
1938 establishments in Virginia